Heracleium or Herakleion, also known as Lamyron, was a port town of ancient Pontus, on the Black Sea, between Amisus and Polemonium. It was situated on a promontory of the same name (called Herakleios akra (Ἡράκλειος ἄκρα) by Strabo, and Herakleous Akron (Ἡρακλέους ἄκρον) by Ptolemy).

Its site is north of the mouth of the Terme River, Anatolia.

References

Populated places in ancient Pontus
Former populated places in Turkey
History of Samsun Province